is a Japanese manga series written and illustrated by Ken Yagami. The manga was published by Akita Shoten between 2000 and 2003 and the chapters collected into 12 tankōbon volumes. An anime television series adaptation animated by J.C.Staff aired on TV Tokyo from January to March 2003. In 2004, the anime series was licensed for distribution in North America by ADV Films and released on DVD in 2006.

Story
The story focuses on the cold and distant seventeen-year-old Nanaka Kirisato, a girl who only cares about studying and getting accepted into a good college. Her childhood friend Nenji Nagihara does not really care about school and often gets into fights. At the start of the story, Nanaka berates Nenji for fighting and tells him that he needs to grow up. After Nenji tells her that he never wants to see her face again, Nanaka is devastated but then falls down a flight of stairs. She loses her memories and suffers from regression, acting like she is six years old. She also thinks that Nenji made a wish to become an adult just like her. Nenji ends up having to watch over her as she goes through high school, which causes trouble and comedic situations.

Characters

Main

The female protagonist and title character, Nanaka is a senior high school student. For her, studying is the most important thing in the world so she has few friends. One day, after a fight with Nenji, she falls down a flight of stairs. This is what causes her memory to be lost back to the time when she was 6 years old. This 6-year-old Nanaka is a very spirited troublemaker and is obsessed with a children's anime television-show called Magical Domiko. The 6-year-old Nanaka is fond of saying the nonsensical words "hayaya" and "hawawa", and is recognizable by her side pigtail and wider eyes.

The male protagonist, Nenji is Nanaka's classmate and childhood friend. He is a delinquent, but after Nanaka's accident, he seems to settle down quite a bit. Nanaka's father asks him to keep Nanaka's accident secret from other people and take care of her at school. Nenji is occasionally referred to as 'Wild Hair Nenji' by some of the other characters because he has long, spiky hair reminiscent of certain stylized Shōnen anime characters.

Yuriko is Nanaka's classmate. Usually called by her last name by other students, she is an honor student, and the role model of a group of girls who dislike Nanaka. She is strict with Nanaka, but discovers Nanaka's secret by accident. Nenji entrusts her to help to keep Nanaka's secret. As she gets to know them both better, she falls in love with Nenji and also becomes kinder to Nanaka.

Supporting characters

Jinpachi is a delinquent and Nenji's rival. He fights Nenji but always loses. When Nenji acts more mature, he gets irritated, however, when he encounters Nanaka acting as a six-year-old, he is charmed by her attitude and falls in love with her. He is the heir to the Arashiyama Dojo but is perceived by his younger sister Satsuki as not being serious about it and is often punished by her surprise attacks.

Satsuki is Jinpachi's younger sister who is often seen with a wooden sword. She initially perceives Nanaka as a hussy for making Jinpachi act all weird around her, so she tries to attack Nanaka, but Nanaka unintentionally dodges her attacks easily. After Nanaka "saves" her from a falling wooden piece, she begs for her forgiveness and wants to be her disciple and she can address Nanaka as "onee-sama" (big sister). She then "trains" Jinpachi harder so he can be a worthy suitor for Nanaka. Her attack catchphrase is "You're wide open!"

Kuriko is a kindergartner with blonde twin-tailed hair. She has a major crush on Nenji because he rescued her from some bullies and because he resembles her older brother who is away for school. She often fights with her rival Nanaka.
 

Taizo is Nanaka's father. Although he is sad that Nanaka is hurt, he is glad to have a chance to be close with his youthful daughter again.

Yoshida is Nanaka's classmate and an avid collector of anime merchandise. He befriends Nanaka after noticing the Magical Domiko toy that she brings to school. Nobody knows who he is until he helps take care of Nenji when he is sick.

Chie is Nanaka's classmate and one of the mean girls who make up rumors about Nanaka. She has brown hair that she wears in twin tails and regularly converses with classmate Mari Tsuyuki who has a ponytail. Towards the end of the series, she has a change of heart at the events leading to the class play where Nanaka replies that she values her feedback and then chooses her to play its starring character.

Magical Domiko characters

Magical Domiko is the magical girl heroine and title character of a very popular children's anime. She uses magic to transform herself into a grown-up and assumes different professions to save the day. Nanaka is a big fan of this anime. Each Nanaka 6/17 episode features a vignette about how she finds the true way to use magic, but Pikota never takes her seriously. Her real name is revealed to be .

Pikota is a bunny-like fairy mascot from the magical world who assists Magical Domiko. Its real name is "Pikoto" and it resents the misnomer by Magical Domiko.

Chemical Kemiko is a green-haired magical girl and Magical Domiko's main rival. She is older and bigger than Magical Domiko and rides on an upright vacuum cleaner. In one of Magical Domiko's short scenes at the end of the episode, she says she has a new anime where she is a future queen of a magical land, and that the evil spirit of Magical Domiko is hurting her kind spirit, but Magical Domiko and Pikota do not believe her.

Media

Manga
 is a 12-tankōbon manga series created by Ken Yagami. The manga was published by Akita Shoten in 2001. The manga was initially licensed by Studio Ironcat for publication in North America but all plans on release were dropped with the company's bankruptcy.

Anime
The manga series was adapted into 12-episode anime television series that was broadcast in Japan on TV Tokyo in 2003. An additional OVA "episode 13" was also produced but not broadcast with the original TV series.

North American releases
In 2004 the anime series was licensed for distribution in North America by ADV Films. ADV Films produced an English language version and released the 12-episode TV series and the OVA episode in three DVD volumes in 2006 and as a complete DVD collection of all episodes in 2008. 
 Nanaka 6/17 - Not So Magical Mishap, DVD volume 1, episodes 1-4, release date:2006-05-23
 Nanaka 6/17 - Reality! Rivalry! Ridicule!, DVD volume 2, episodes 5-8, release date:2006-07-18
 Nanaka 6/17 - Nanaka vs Nanaka!, DVD volume 3, episodes 9-12 and OVA episode 13, release date:2006-09-12
 Nanaka 6/17 - Complete Collection, episodes 1-12 and OVA episode 13, release date:2008-12-23
The North American license is now held by Section23 Films. All 13 episodes of the ADV Films English version (only) are posted on the Anime Network website for online streaming.

Theme songs
Opening

Sunao na Mama (素直なまま) by Funta

Ending

Taisetsu na Negai (大切な願い) by CooRie

Episode list

References

External links
 Nanaka 6/17 at TV Tokyo 
 Nanaka 6/17 at King Records 
 

2000 manga
2003 anime television series debuts
ADV Films
Akita Shoten manga
Fiction about amnesia
Comedy anime and manga
Dissociative identity disorder in television
J.C.Staff
School life in anime and manga
Shōnen manga
TV Tokyo original programming